The Two-woman competition at the 2017 World Championships was held on 17 and 18 February 2017.

Results
The first two runs were held on 17 and the two last runs on 18 February 2017.

References

Two-woman